The Voluntary CQC Mark Certification is a voluntary product certification for Chinese products or products that are imported to China. The Voluntary CQC Mark Certification can be applied for products which are not in the China Compulsory Certification product catalogue and thus cannot receive a China Compulsory Certificate (CCC Certificate). The CQC Mark guarantees the conformity of the product with the Chinese standards (Guobiao standards) regarding safety, quality, environmental and energy efficiencies. Products marked with the CQC Mark are less likely to be detained at Chinese customs. In addition, the CQC Mark raises the competitiveness of a product in the Chinese market. 
The whole certification process is similar to the Compulsory China Certificate (CCC) certification process.

Administration 
The Voluntary CQC Mark Certification is conducted by the China Quality Certification Center, the largest professional certification body that is sanctioned by the governmental agency CCIC (China Certification & Inspection Group). The CQC is also responsible for the mandated process for manufacturers to receive their CCC certification. The Voluntary CQC Mark Certification product range covers more than 500 products that do not require a mandatory CCC certification.

Applicable products 
The following products can receive a CQC Mark, if they do not require a mandatory CCC certification: 
 Electric products and electronic components
 Household electric appliance accessories
 Electrical accessories
 Audio and video apparatus 
 Lighting apparatus and tools (lamps and luminaries)
 Power tools
 Small and medium-sized electric machines and accessories
 Medical instruments/Medical devices
 Household and similar electrical appliances
 Machines
 Commercially used machines
 Electric wires and cables
 Low voltage apparatus
 Automotive and motorbike accessories, e.g. tyres
 Glass
 Power system relay protection and automation devices
 Water pumps
 Electric meters
 Low voltage apparatus and accessories
 High voltage equipment and appliances
 Generator sets
 Photovoltaic products
 Motors
 Additional CQC Certification for CCC certified wires and cables
 Test and control instruments
 Earthmoving machineries and accessories
 Electric vehicle charging stations and plugs
 Wind power products
 Thermal energy products
 Construction materials
 Textiles
 Building products
 Sanitary products
 Cement products
 Office equipment 
 Surge protection
 Light electric vehicles and accessories
 Electric cars and accessories
 Bearing products
 Restriction of Hazardous Substances (RoHS1 certification)
 Certification for non-metallic materials and parts
 School supplies
 Certification for the restricted use of polycyclic aromatic hydrocarbons (PAHs)
 Accumulators and batteries
 Metal welding, cutting and heat treatment Equipment

Certification process
The certification process is similar to the CCC certification process. With good consultancy, the CQC Mark Certification can be received in 4 months. Self-applicants may take up to 8 months to finish the whole certification procedure. The process includes the following steps:

Submission of application documents and supporting materials
Type Testing. A CNCA-designated test laboratory in China will test product samples
Factory Inspection. CQC will send representatives to inspect the manufacturing facilities
Evaluation of the results
Approval of the CQC Certificate (or failure and retesting)
Receiving the Voluntary CQC Mark Certification 
Application for Marking Permission at the CNCA
Annual Follow-up Factory Inspections by Chinese officials

Follow-Up Certification 
In order to keep the validity of the certification, the CQC certificate and printing permission of the CQC mark must be renewed annually as part of a follow-up certification. Follow-up certifications require a one-day factory inspection. The follow-up procedure is much shorter than the initial certification process. Moreover, it is associated with lower costs.

Charges 
Depending on the product, the fee charging for the CQC Mark Certification can vary. The following list gives an overview about the costs: 
 Submission fees and administrative charge 
 Charge for type testings in China 
 Factory inspection fees
 Travel expenses of the Chinese officials that will be sent to inspect the factory 
 Charges for application of Marking Permission at the CNCA

Additional costs: 
 Translator/interpreter fees 
 Product costs for type testings 
 shipping/mail costs 
 Additional fees when type testings are not successful 
 Costs for optional change/extension of certificate (much lower than initial certification)

Benefits of a Voluntary CQC Mark Certification
Products marked with a CQC Mark enjoy high reputation on the Chinese market. It shows that the product conforms the requirements of the Chinese standards in regard to safety, quality, environment and performance. It will highly increase the product's competitiveness in the Chinese and international market, and as well facilitates a smoother access of foreign enterprises’ products into the domestic market. 
The official China Compulsory Certificate product catalogue is constantly going to be extended. This means that a product that did not require the mandatory CCC Certificate before can fall under the new product range. The Voluntary CQC Mark Certification can be relatively easily changed into a mandatory CCC Certificate which gives the manufacturer huge advantages ahead to his competitors.

See also 
 Common Criteria
 National Development and Reform Commission
 Guobiao standards

References

General references
 "A Brief Guide to CCC: China Compulsory Certification", Julian Busch, 
Official CQC website
CNCA website

Symbols introduced in 2002
Certification marks
Economy of China
Safety codes
Foreign trade of China